In cognitive science, prototype-matching is a theory of pattern recognition that describes the process by which a sensory unit registers a new stimulus and compares it to the prototype, or standard model, of said stimulus. Unlike template matching and featural analysis, an exact match is not expected for prototype-matching, allowing for a more flexible model. An object is recognized by the sensory unit when a similar prototype match is found.

The theory of multiple discrimination scaling has advanced prototype-matching and other template-matching theories.

See also
Perception
Cognitive Psychology
Geon (psychology)

References
 Galotti, K. M. (2008). Cognitive psychology: in and out of the laboratory. (4 ed.). USA: Michele Sordi.

Cognitive psychology